Human Desolation is the second full-length album by German band X Marks the Pedwalk. It was released by Zoth Ommog in Europe as both an LP and CD, and in North America by Cleopatra Records as a CD.

According to André Schmechta, Human Desolation is X Marks the Pedwalk's best-selling release.

Track listing
 "I See You" – 3:48
 "The Relapse" – 3:40
 "Desolation" – 7:08
 "Repulsion" – 6:14
 "Criminal Disharmony" – 3:55
 "Paranoid Illusions" – 4:10
 "Experience" – 6:22
 "The Trap" – 4:29
 "Taciturnity" – 2:52
 "...Call You..." – 4:05
 "Don't Fall Asleep" – 3:47

Personnel
Sevren Ni-arb
Raive Yarx

The music and lyrics on Human Desolation were written by André Schmechta (also known as Sevren Ni-arb) and performed by both André and Thorsten Schmechta (a.k.a. Raive Yarx).  Human Desolation was recorded and mixed at T.G.I.F. studios in Germany.

External links
Entry at official X Marks the Pedwalk website.
Entry at Discogs.com

1993 albums
X Marks the Pedwalk albums
Cleopatra Records albums